The 1985 Monaco Grand Prix was a Formula One motor race held at Monaco on 19 May 1985. It was the fourth race of the 1985 Formula One World Championship.

The 78-lap race was won by Alain Prost, driving a McLaren-TAG. Ayrton Senna took pole position in his Lotus-Renault and led until he suffered an engine failure on lap 14. Michele Alboreto finished second in a Ferrari, with Elio de Angelis third in the other Lotus-Renault.

After the race, de Angelis led the Drivers' Championship by two points from Prost and Alboreto.

Summary
As usual for the time, the FIA allowed only 20 cars to start the race, due to the tight confines of the Monaco circuit. The Toleman team entered their first race of the season, having missed the opening three rounds due to not having tyres. Having bought out the tyre contract of the struggling Spirit team, Toleman were able to race for the rest of the season. This was the first race in which they were sponsored by the Benetton clothing company, who would buy the team and rename it Benetton Formula from 1986 onwards.

There was a big accident on the pit straight involving Nelson Piquet and Riccardo Patrese, this accident was to affect the outcome of the race. The accident happened right after Piquet and Patrese crossed the start/finish line, Piquet attempted to pass Patrese, the two cars touched and Patrese crashed violently and collected Piquet, whose Brabham's rear suspension broke during the collision before Patrese collected Piquet. The cars then spun into the run-off at the first corner at Sainte Devote; both drivers were unhurt. Patrese's gearbox dropped oil onto the track which took out Niki Lauda who while sliding off on the oil managed to avoid hitting anything, he stalled his engine and was out on the spot. The crash also nearly took out the closely following Jacques Laffite and Teo Fabi, while race leader Michele Alboreto also slid wide on the oil; Alboreto's off handed the lead to Alain Prost. Alboreto drove a hard race; he eventually caught and passed Prost 3 laps later, but was re-passed by Prost after he punctured his left rear tyre at the first corner where Piquet and Patrese crashed. This dropped him to 4th behind Andrea de Cesaris, Elio de Angelis and Prost; he caught and passed his compatriots but could not catch Prost; who despite a leaking turbo wastegate, had kept the gap wide enough for Alboreto to be unable to catch him in the remaining laps.

Classification

Qualifying

Race

Championship standings after the race

Drivers' Championship standings

Constructors' Championship standings

References

Monaco Grand Prix
Monaco Grand Prix
Grand Prix
May 1985 sports events in Europe